Cannon-launched guided projectiles (CLGP) are precision-guided munitions launched by howitzers, mortars, tank guns, and naval guns. Those projectile main propulsion system is the initial kinetic shoot, directed as much as possible toward the target. A secondary GPS or geocoordinates-based system then corrects the trajectory to increase target accuracy and fall closer to the target. This system relies on electronic guidance and pre-programmed coordinates, submitted to the round before its launch. CLGP are intended to supplement and not supplant conventional rounds, providing additional accuracy when needed. For example, the INVAR missile system on the T-90 MBT.

Systems capable of firing CLGPs

120×570mm NATO
Arjun MBT
Merkava
120 mm mortar
 PLL-05
 125 mm smoothbore ammunition
T-64
T-72
T-80
T-90
152 mm 
M60A2
M551 Sheridan
MBT-70

List of CLGPs

Tank
 105x617mm NATO
 LAHAT
 FALARICK
 120×570mm NATO
 LAHAT
 KSTAM
 SAMHO (planned to also support 125 mm smoothbore)
 125 mm smoothbore ammunition
 9K112 Kobra
 9M119 Svir/Refleks
 152 mm
 MGM-51 Shillelagh

Naval

 5-inch, US naval (mainly Mark 45)
 BTERM (abandoned)
 ERGM
Excalibur N5
 155 mm Advanced Gun System
 LRLAP (abandoned)
 8"/55 caliber Mark 71 gun)
 SAM-N-8 Zeus (abandoned)

Howitzer
 122 mm
Kitolov-2M (also in a 120 mm mortar version)
 152 mm
Krasnopol (Weapon) semi-automatic laser-guided (also in 155 mm for export)
 155 mm
 M1156 Precision Guidance Kit
 M712 Copperhead
 M982 Excalibur
 Basir
 Bofors 155 Bonus
 SMArt 155
 Rheinmetall Denel Munitions 155 mm V-LAP
GP1 (Chinese Krasnopol clone)
GP6 (Improved GP1)

Mortar
81 mm mortar
Merlin Mortar round - millimetric radar guided 
 120 mm mortar
XM395 Precision Guided Mortar Munition
Strix mortar round
KM-8 Gran is a Russian guided 120mm artillery shell with Malakhit fire control system.
GP120 (GP4) is a  Chinese terminal corrected 120 mm mortar shell.
GP140 (GP9) is a Chinese semi-active laser (SAL) guidance 120 mm mortar shell.

See also
 Missile tank

References

External link

Weapon guidance
Targeting (warfare)
Artillery shells